Roland Licker (3 February 1932 – 6 January 1974) was a Luxembourgian sprint canoeist who competed in the early 1950s. He was born in Luxembourg City. At the 1952 Summer Olympics in Helsinki, he finished 18th in the K-1 10000 m being eliminated in heats of the K-1 1000 m event.

References
Roland Licker's profile at Sports Reference.com

1932 births
1974 deaths
Sportspeople from Luxembourg City
Canoeists at the 1952 Summer Olympics
Luxembourgian male canoeists
Olympic canoeists of Luxembourg